× Vandachostylis, abbreviated Van. in the horticultural trade, is the nothogenus for intergeneric hybrids between the orchid genera Rhynchostylis and Vanda (Rhy. × V.). It is now the accepted name for several former hybrid genera, such as × Vascostylis and × Neostylis, since Ascocentrum and Neofinetia are now both synonymous with Vanda.

References

Orchid nothogenera
Aeridinae